Belsunce is a district near Canebière, central Marseille. Its name was given by Monseigneur Henri François Xavier de Belsunce de Castelmoron, who famously helped during the Great Plague of Marseille.

Belsunce is a popular area from the "Centre Bourse" to the big shopping crentre of central Marseille. It includes the famous Alcazar, an old theatre that has been converted into a library.

External links
http://www.dailymotion.com/video/xmp105_belsunce-un-quartier-cosmopolite-marseille_creation
http://www.marseilleforum.com/5-quartier-belsunce-noailles-porte-d-aix.htm
http://gmlveb.blogspot.ca/p/visite-du-quartier-de-belsunce.html

Quarters of Marseille